Santa Maria la Carità is a comune (municipality) in the  Metropolitan City of Naples in the Italian region Campania, located about  southeast of Naples.

References

Cities and towns in Campania